Wang Chao (born 11 October 1985) is a Chinese sailor. He won a bronze medal at the 2014 Asian Games in the men's 470 event. Four years later, at the 2018 Asian Games, he won the silver medal in the same event.

References

External links
 

1985 births
Living people
Chinese male sailors (sport)
Place of birth missing (living people)
Asian Games medalists in sailing
Sailors at the 2014 Asian Games
Sailors at the 2018 Asian Games
Medalists at the 2014 Asian Games
Medalists at the 2018 Asian Games
Asian Games silver medalists for China
Asian Games bronze medalists for China
21st-century Chinese people